Ramanujacharya is a 1989 Tamil-language film written and directed by G. V. Iyer. The film is a biographical film on Ramanujacharya.

Plot

Cast

References

External links 
 

Indian biographical films
1989 films
1980s Tamil-language films
1980s biographical films